Vitex orinocensis is a species of tree in the family Lamiaceae. It is native to South America.

References

orinocensis
Trees of Peru
Trees of Ecuador
Trees of Colombia
Trees of Brazil
Trees of Venezuela
Trees of Guyana
Trees of French Guiana
Trees of Suriname
Plants described in 1818